MSSTYLES is a Microsoft file format, that contains the bitmaps and metadata for the Windows XP skinning engine, first introduced in Windows Whistler Build 2250.

The engine, in its unmodified state, only fully applies .msstyles files that have been digitally signed by Microsoft, such as Luna or the Zune theme. The default Windows XP style is known as Luna, but additional custom-made styles are available on the Internethowever, few are digitally signed. Four other signed styles for Windows XP include Royale (Media Center Edition) (Energy Blue), Royale Noir, Windows Embedded Standard CTP Refresh, and the Zune Style.

Unsigned styles can be used via various methods, by means of manually patching or replacing system files or automatically by one of the programs made for this purpose. These programs are usually called "UxTheme patchers" from the name of the XP library that required patching, UxTheme.dll, despite that recent Windows versions require patches to different files. Many popular and freely distributed patchers can be found online, often using different ways to enable custom themes.

Windows Vista and later also use .msstyles files for skinning (like the Aero.msstyles file), however the format of these files is significantly different, so .msstyles files are not transferable between Windows Vista and Windows XP.  This version of .msstyles file contains PNG images and metadata.

There is a manual way to replace three DLL files (uxtheme.dll, shsvcs.dll and themeui.dll) to use unsigned custom visual styles in Windows Vista.

File format 

.msstyles files are 32-bit PE files, however they don't contain code or ordinary data. Instead they store all style information in resources. Microsoft provided styles contain PE version metadata, despite Explorer not displaying this data for .msstyles files in recent Windows versions. PE signing is not used, instead a custom signature is appended to the file.

Signature format 

Offsets in the following table are relative to end of file.

See also 

Luna (theme)
Royale (theme)
Aero (theme)

References

External links 
VistaGlazz - UxTheme patcher
Patched file repository

Windows files
Digital container formats